Fort Greene is a neighborhood in Brooklyn, New York.

Fort Greene may also refer to:
 Fort Greene, North Carolina
 Fort Greene Park, Brooklyn, NY
 Fort Greene Historic District, Brooklyn, NY
 Fort Greene (Newport, Rhode Island), a War of 1812 fort
 Fort Greene (Narragansett, Rhode Island), WW2 coast defense fort, current Army Reserve center
 Success Academy Fort Greene, part of Success Academy Charter Schools

See also 
 Fort Green, a fort in Florida
 Fort Greene Ville, formerly a fort in Ohio and now a renamed city